Dr. Petar Beron (c. 1799, Kotel – 21 March 1871) was a Bulgarian educator.

He created the first modern Bulgarian primer, known as the Fish Primer (Рибен буквар, Riben bukvar) due to a dolphin drawn in the end of the book. Beron has been called "the father of modern Bulgaria."

Biography
Petar Beron was born around 1800, probably in 1799, in the town of Kotel in a rich family of handcraftsmen and merchants. In Kotel he received his primary education at the church school of Stoyko Vladislavov and Rayno Popovich. He furthered his education in Bucharest, where he entered the school of Greek educator Konstantin Vardalach. The latter, famous pedagogist and encyclopaedist at the time, has significantly influenced Beron's development as a scientist and philosopher.

He worked in Bucharest and Craiova, but after several years of general practice quit his job and started a business in merchandise. Fifteen years later, having made a fortune, he went to Paris where he rented an apartment, where he started his real scientific career. His ambition was to study all the human knowledge by that time and to make a nature-philosophical evaluation by creating a new Panepisteme. His encyclopaedism was remarkable. Dr. Beron spoke nine languages and wrote about 30 volumes, not counting two dictionaries, an atlas, his doctoral dissertation (written in Latin), and the Fish Primer.

Scientific work
There are certain facts, which come to show Dr. Beron's standing among scientists of the time. On the session of the Royal Academy of Science in London, held on 20 June 1850, Sir John Lee presented his work On the System of Atmospherology and acknowledged Beron's activity. In 1853 Dr. Beron was invited by the Association of Natural Sciences in Athens where he read an article titled Earth before the Deluge. In 1855 he published his Slavic Philosophy in the German language, where an outline of his Panepisteme is featured. In 1858 Origins of Physical and Natural Sciences and of Metaphysical and Moral Sciences was printed in the French language.

The next two years were devoted to a huge cosmographical atlas with descriptions. The maps in the atlas were designed by the famous Bulgarian painter Nicolaus Pavlovich. But the height of his scientific endeavours was the Panepisteme, in seven volumes, which was published in French in the beginning of 1861. Until the end of his life on 21 March 1871 he was devoted to this interesting and creative task.

Philosophical views
Beron spent some 25 years of his life in Paris and other European cities. He seriously and systematically studied western philosophy and culture, witnessing the endeavours of classical positivism, most notably of his contemporary Auguste Comte, to replace materialism and idealism with a third line in philosophy. However, Beron sincerely believed in the independence of his philosophy Panepisteme. He considered Aristotle to be the ultimate scientific authority. These are the main influences on Beron's beliefs in philosophy and logic.

Legacy
Beron Point on Robert Island, South Shetland Islands, Antarctica is named for Petar Beron, as is Language School "Dr. Petar Beron" in Kyustendil, Bulgaria.

Beron is portrayed on the obverse of the Bulgarian 10,000 levs banknote issued in 1997 and of the 10 levs banknote issued in 1999 and 2008.

References

External links

Bukvar's Razlichny Poucheniia From the Early Bulgarian Imprint Collection at the Library of Congress

1871 deaths
Bulgarian writers
Textbook writers
Bulgarian educators
People from Kotel, Bulgaria
Bulgarian expatriates in Romania
Bulgarian expatriates in France
19th-century Bulgarian educators
1790s births